Serhii Volodymyrovych Cherniavskyi, or Serhiy Volodymyrovych Chernyavsʼkyy (born 2 April 1976) is a retired Ukrainian cyclist. He won a silver medal at the 2000 Summer Olympics and a world title in 2001 in the 4000 m team pursuit.

After retiring from competitions, he taught cycling while working on his PhD at the Vinnytsia State Pedagogical University.

References

1976 births
Living people
Ukrainian male cyclists
Olympic cyclists of Ukraine
Cyclists at the 2000 Summer Olympics
Olympic medalists in cycling
Olympic silver medalists for Ukraine
Place of birth missing (living people)
Sportspeople from Vinnytsia
Medalists at the 2000 Summer Olympics
UCI Track Cycling World Champions (men)
Ukrainian track cyclists